Miami Council may refer to several local councils of the Boy Scouts of America:

 Miami Valley Council in Ohio
 Miami Council (Florida), now South Florida Council
 Miami Council (Oklahoma), now Cherokee Area Council
 Dayton-Miami Valley Area Council, now Miami Valley Council in Ohio